Young at Heart is a 1987 American short documentary film produced by Pamela Conn and Sue Marx about the painters Louis Gothelf and Reva Shwayder. In 1988, it won an Oscar for Documentary Short Subject at the 60th Academy Awards.

Cast
 Louis Gothelf as Himself
 Reva Shwayder-Gothelf as Herself (as Reva Shwayder)

References

External links
 
 

1987 films
1987 short films
1987 documentary films
1987 independent films
American short documentary films
American independent films
1980s English-language films
Best Documentary Short Subject Academy Award winners
1980s short documentary films
Documentary films about old age
1980s American films